The 1986–87 NBA season was the Spurs' 11th season in the NBA and 20th season as a franchise.

Draft picks

Roster

Regular season

Season standings

z - clinched division title
y - clinched division title
x - clinched playoff spot

Record vs. opponents

Game log

Player statistics

Awards and records
Alvin Robertson, NBA All-Defensive First Team

Transactions

References

See also
1986-87 NBA season

San Antonio Spurs seasons
San Antonio
San Antonio
San Antonio